Leptodora is a genus containing two species of large, nearly transparent predatory water fleas. The legs are used to catch copepods that it comes into contact with by chance. Leptodora kindtii is found in temperate lakes across the Northern Hemisphere and is probably the only cladoceran ever described in a newspaper; L. richardi is only known from eastern Russia. For most of the year, Leptodora reproduces parthenogenetically, with males only appearing late in the season, to produce winter eggs which hatch the following spring. Leptodora is the only genus in its family, the Leptodoridae, and suborder, Haplopoda.

Description
They are about 98% transparent, as a defense against predation by fish. Lilljeborg notes: 
The female is transparent to such a high degree, literally "as clear as water", that her presence is often only given away by her movements. In bright sunlight, the shadow is normally seen before the animal itself.
The male is similarly transparent. The abdomen is elongated, but the carapace is small and only covers the brood pouch.

The six pairs of thoracic appendages form a "feeding basket" which is used to capture prey. The second antennae are used for swimming, while the first antennae are rudimentary in females but elongated in males, where they are used in sexual reproduction. There is a single large compound eye which takes up much of the animal's head. It comprises around 500 facets, which are spherically arranged, and the whole eye is movable by up to 10° in any direction.

Distribution
Leptodora kindtii is widespread in northern temperate lakes. In North America, it occurs as far south as Texas and Oklahoma. It is also found across Europe, in parts of North Africa, northern Arabia, and in Asia (north of the Himalaya).

Ecology and behaviour

Leptodora kindtii is a voracious predator and is capable of controlling numbers of its preferred prey items, which are generally juveniles of Daphnia, Bosmina, Ceriodaphnia, Diaphanosoma, Diaptomus, Polyphemus and Cyclops. It seems to encounter its prey by chance, with contact initiating a reflex, in which the abdomen is brought forward to close the feeding basket. In many cases, the prey escapes this haphazard response. Juvenile Daphnia are slower than adults to respond to the predator's attack, and are therefore more likely to be caught.

The most important predators of Leptodora are fishes, including whitefish, perch, ziege and bleak.

In Lake Biwa, Japan, L. kindtii is parasitised by the nematode Raphidascaris biwakoensis, a parasite of fish.

Life cycle
Female Leptodora produce a brood of eggs through parthenogenesis every 12 hours. The time taken to reach adulthood is temperature dependent, but takes between 3 and 6 days. For most of the year, reproduction is parthenogenetic, with eggs being produced by females without males being present in the population. In the autumn, parthenogenetically produced males begin to appear; males and females then reproduce sexually. The resulting eggs sink to the bottom where they overwinter, hatching the following year as nauplius-like larvae.

Related taxa
Leptodora is so distinct from other cladocerans that some authors have suggested grouping all other cladocerans into a clade called "Eucladocera", with Leptodora as its sister group. It is now believed, however, that Leptodora is sister to Onychopoda, being the only genus in the family Leptodoridae and the subclass Haplopoda. Features which separate it from other families include its large size, the lack of branchial appendages (gills) on its legs, the reduction of the carapace, and the fact that the winter eggs hatch as nauplii.

Taxonomic history

Leptodora kindtii is "probably the only cladoceran ever described in a newspaper". The German microscopist Gustav Woldemar Focke organised a scientific meeting in Bremen in 1844 together with the pharmacist Georg Christian Kindt. He studied the fauna of the ditches surrounding the city (the ) and displayed live specimens at the meeting. However, this description was ignored by the scientific community, and Wilhelm Lilljeborg described the species in 1861 with the name Leptodora hyalina. The synonymy was not noticed until Simon Albrecht Poppe informed Lilljeborg of it in 1889, and Lilljeborg corrected the error in his 1900 monograph.

In 2009, a second species, Leptodora richardii, was described from individuals collected from lakes in the Amur River basin, including Lake Bolon.

Synonyms
Synonyms of Leptodora kindtii include:
Polyphemus kindti Focke, 1844
Hyalosoma dux Wagner, 1868
Leptodora angusta Sars, 1890
Leptodora hyalina Lilljeborg, 1861
Leptodora pellucida Joseph, 1882

Etymology
The specific epithet kindtii is presumed to refer to G. C. Kindt, who worked closely with Focke. The alternative spelling kindti is sometimes encountered, but is no longer considered correct under the International Code of Zoological Nomenclature. The epithet hyalina, used by Lilljeborg, is from the Greek , and means glassy.

External links

References

Cladocera
Branchiopoda genera
Taxa named by Wilhelm Lilljeborg